Bob Bryan and Mike Bryan were the defending champions, but lost to Daniel Nestor and Nenad Zimonjić in the semifinals.
Nestor and Zimonjić went on to win the title, defeating Robin Haase and Feliciano López in the final, 6–4, 7–6(7–2).

Seeds
All seeds receive a bye into the second round. 

  Bob Bryan /  Mike Bryan (semifinals)
  Alexander Peya /  Bruno Soares (second round)
  Ivan Dodig /  Marcelo Melo (quarterfinals)
  David Marrero /  Fernando Verdasco (quarterfinals)
  Nicolas Mahut /  Édouard Roger-Vasselin (second round)
  Daniel Nestor /  Nenad Zimonjić (champions)
  Łukasz Kubot /  Robert Lindstedt (second round)
  Treat Huey /  Dominic Inglot (second round)

Draw

Finals

Top half

Bottom half

References
 Main Draw

Italian Open - Doubles
Men's Doubles